Davide Possanzini (born 9 February 1976 in Loreto) is an Italian football coach and former forward or attacking midfielder. He was most recently the head coach of Serie B club Brescia.

Playing career
Possanzini started his career with amateur team Recanatese in 1992. He was signed by Torino in 1994, but never made a first team appearance and was later sold to Serie C2 side Lecco. He left Lecco after two seasons to join Varese, another Serie C2 club, helping the biancorossi to ensure promotion to Serie C1.

Signed by Serie B club Reggina in September 1998, he immediately won a personal second promotion scoring nine goals in his first season with the amaranto. He made his Serie A debut on 29 August 1999 in a 1–1 tie at Juventus's home. In January 2001, after two and a half seasons with Reggina, he signed for Serie B fallen giants Sampdoria, but failed to make a major breakthrough during his stay with the blucerchiati. After an unimpressive season with Catania in 2002–03, Possanzini was signed by Serie B minnows AlbinoLeffe, where he quickly regained his best form and proved himself as a key player for his new club.

In January 2005 Possanzini signed for Palermo and marked his return in the Serie A, but a number of injuries prevented him from being actively part of the Sicilian side, and played only twice with the rosanero before being sold again during the summer market, this time to Brescia, as partial compensation in the deal that brought Andrea Caracciolo to Palermo. He is currently a mainstay for the rondinelle, and scored 24 goals in his first two seasons with Brescia, both played in the Serie B.

In January 2009, Possanzini was banned for a year, along with Daniele Mannini (now of Napoli), by the Court of Arbitration for Sport, under request from the World Anti-Doping Agency, for being late at the anti-doping controls after Brescia's game with Chievo in December 2007. Both players were originally acquitted by the Italian Football Federation, and successively condemned to a 15-days ban by CONI. The ban was successively suspended by the Court of Arbitration for Sport itself later on March, and cancelled on 27 July 2009 after being proved there was no real intention to avoid the controls from Possanzini and Mannini.

Coaching career
In 2013, Possanzini moved back to Brescia as a youth coach in charge of the Allievi Nazionali, and then the Primavera (Under-19 squad). He subsequently joined the coaching staff of Roberto De Zerbi, following him during his tenures at Foggia, Palermo, Benevento, Sassuolo and FC Shakhtar Donetsk. In February 2022, together with De Zerbi and his coaching staff, he harrowingly fleed from Ukraine in the aftermath of the Russian invasion.

On 16 June 2022, Possanzini agreed to return to Brescia as the club's Primavera youth coach. On 7 January 2023, he was named new head coach in charge of the first team following the dismissal of Pep Clotet, being however sacked just thirteen days later after suffering two defeats in both games in charge of the team.

Coaching statistics

References

1976 births
Living people
Sportspeople from the Province of Ancona
Association football forwards
Italian footballers
Italian expatriate footballers
Italian expatriate football managers
Expatriate football managers in Ukraine
Italian expatriate sportspeople in Ukraine
Expatriate footballers in Switzerland
Torino F.C. players
S.S.D. Varese Calcio players
Reggina 1914 players
U.C. Sampdoria players
Catania S.S.D. players
Brescia Calcio players
Palermo F.C. players
U.C. AlbinoLeffe players
FC Lugano players
U.S. Cremonese players
Calcio Lecco 1912 players
Serie A players
Serie B players
Serie C players
Footballers from Marche
FC Shakhtar Donetsk non-playing staff
Italian football managers
Brescia Calcio managers
Serie B managers